All Star Smash Hits is a compilation album by the American rock band Smash Mouth, released on August 23, 2005 by Interscope Records. It includes tracks from their first four albums and non-album material.

Track listing

References

External links

All Star Smash Hits at YouTube (streamed copy where licensed)

Smash Mouth albums
2005 greatest hits albums
Universal Records compilation albums